Razole mandal is one of the 22 mandals in Konaseema district of Andhra Pradesh. As per census 2011, there are 13 villages in this mandal.

Demographics 
Razole mandal has total population of 71,433 as per the 2011 Census out of which 35,468 are males while 35,965 are females. The average sex ratio is 1014. The total literacy rate is 83%.

Towns and villages

Villages 
1. B. Savaram
2. Chintalapalle
3. Kadali
4. Katrenipadu
5. Kunavaram
6. Mulikipalle
7. Palagummi
8. Podalada
9. Ponnamanda
10. Razole
11. Sivakodu
12. Sompalle
13. Tatipaka

See also 
List of mandals in Andhra Pradesh

References 

Mandals in Konaseema district
Mandals in Andhra Pradesh